Zac Mizell (born September 1, 1988) is an American rugby union player for the Austin Elite in Major League Rugby, he previously played for the Ohio Aviators in PRO Rugby. His position is at fullback.

He played amateur rugby for Dallas Harlequins and has represented the United States in rugby sevens. He signed with the Ohio Aviators for the inaugural PRO Rugby season in 2016.

References

Living people
Rugby union fullbacks
United States international rugby sevens players
American rugby union players
Ohio Aviators players
Dallas Harlequins players
1988 births
Austin Gilgronis players